Courtemaîche is a former municipality in the district of Porrentruy in the canton of Jura in Switzerland.  On 1 January, 2009 the former municipalities of Buix, Courtemaîche and Montignez merged to form the new municipality of Basse-Allaine. It has a total area of 894 km sq (345 sq mile) and a population of 664.

References

External links

Municipalities of the canton of Jura
Populated places disestablished in 2009